Bidaran-e Now (also Romanized as Bīdarān-e Now; also known as Bīdarān-e Bālā, Deh Davang, and Dowdānag-e Bīdarān) is a village in Howmeh Rural District, in the Central District of Bam County, Kerman Province, Iran. At the 2006 census, its population was 417, in 94 families.

References 

Populated places in Bam County